The Catlin Wilson House, also known as the Murphy Dunlap House, is a historic Greek Revival style house in Eutaw, Alabama, United States.  The one-story wood-framed building was built in 1844.  A pedimented front portico with four Doric columns covers the three central bays of the front facade.  The house was recorded by the Historic American Buildings Survey in 1936.  It was listed on the Alabama Register of Landmarks and Heritage on November 5, 1976.   It was subsequently added to the National Register of Historic Places as a part of the Antebellum Homes in Eutaw Thematic Resource on April 2, 1982, due to its architectural significance.

References

External links
 

National Register of Historic Places in Greene County, Alabama
Houses on the National Register of Historic Places in Alabama
Properties on the Alabama Register of Landmarks and Heritage
Houses completed in 1844
Greek Revival houses in Alabama
Houses in Greene County, Alabama
Historic American Buildings Survey in Alabama